The Badoglio II government of Italy held office from 22 April until 18 June 1944, a total of 57 days, or 1 months and 27 days. It was the first government in Italian history with the presence of the socialists and the communists.

Government parties
The government was composed by the following parties:

Composition

References

Italian governments
1944 establishments in Italy
1944 disestablishments in Italy